Swift as a crater may refer to:

 Swift (lunar crater)
 Swift (Deimian crater)